Nana Ekua Brew-Hammond (born October 5) is an American-Ghanaian writer of novels, short stories and a poet. She has written for AOL, Parenting Magazine, the Village Voice, Metro and Trace Magazine. Her short story "Bush Girl" was published in the May 2008 issues of African Writing and her poem "The Whinings of a Seven Sister Cum Laude Graduate Working Board as an Assistant" was published in 2006’s Growing up Girl Anthology. A cum laude graduate of Vassar College, she attended secondary school in Ghana. Her book Powder Necklace is loosely based on the experience. In 2014 she was chosen as one of 39 of Sub-Saharan Africa's most promising writers under the age of 40, showcased in the Africa39 project and included in the anthology Africa39: New Writing from Africa South of the Sahara (edited by Ellah Allfrey). She is also a contributor to the 2019 anthology New Daughters of Africa, edited by Margaret Busby.

Personal life and education

She was born in the small town of Plattsburgh, New York. Her parents moved to New York City and then to Queens, where Brew-Hammond grew up before, at the age of 12, being sent back to Ghana, with her siblings, to attend secondary school by her parents. She went to one of the more prestigious girls secondary school in Ghana, Mfantsiman Girls' Secondary School in the Central Region. She is a cum laude graduate of Vassar College, Poughkeepsie, NY.  She now has 10 years of experience in the writing world.

Writing career

In 2014, she was included among some of the most promising African authors under 39 in the Hay Festival-Rainbow Book Club Project Africa39: New Writing from Africa South of the Sahara (Bloomsbury). The Africa39 anthology was published in celebration of UNESCO's designation of Port Harcourt, Nigeria, as 2014 World Book Capital. Most recently, she was shortlisted for the 2014 Miles Morland Writing Scholarship.

Also a style & culture writer, Brew-Hammond has been featured on MSNBC, NY1, SaharaTV, and ARISE TV, and has been published in Ebony Magazine, Ethiopian Airlines' Selamata Magazine, EBONY.com, The Village Voice, on NBC's thegrio.com, and MadameNoire.com, among other outlets". Her short story "After Edwin" is included in the 2019 anthology New Daughters of Africa, edited by Margaret Busby.

Selected writings

 Powder Necklace (novel), 2010
 "Bush Girl"
 "The Whinings of a Seven Sister Cum Laude Graduate Working Bored as an Assistant"{

Interviews

 "Author Nana Ekua Brew-Hammond speaks to WomenWerk on advocacy, inspirations and keeping a day job"
 "An Interview with Nana Ekua Brew-Hammond, author of Powder Necklace"
 "Author Nana Ekua Brew-Hammond Discusses the Inspiration for Her Debut Novel, Powder Necklace". YouTube video.
 "Nana Ekua Brew-Hammond - Activism and Art: Personal Journeys in the Diaspora - Full Interview", AfricanFilmFest. YouTube, August 13, 2015.

References

External links
 Official website
 @nanaekuawriter at Instagram
 @nanaekua Twitter

21st-century American novelists
Living people
Year of birth missing (living people)
American people of Ghanaian descent
People from Plattsburgh, New York
21st-century American short story writers
21st-century American poets
American women novelists
American women short story writers
American women poets
Novelists from New York (state)
21st-century American women writers
Mfantsiman Girls' Secondary School alumni